Ngwe may be,

Ngwe language
Ngwe Kyun beach
Htay Ngwe
Ngwe Gaing